Jang Joon-hwan (born January 18, 1970) is a South Korean film director.

Life and career
A graduate of Sungkyunkwan University, Jang's first directing job was on the 1994 short film 2001 Imagine. His feature-length debut was the science fiction film Save the Green Planet! (2003), considered one of the most unique and original films in the history of Korean cinema. Jang won Best Director at the 4th Busan Film Critics Awards, and the Special Silver St. George for Best Director at the 25th Moscow International Film Festival.

He directed two more short films Hair (2004), and Love for Sale (2010, as part of the omnibus Camellia, about the past, present and future of the city Busan). Then in 2013, Jang's long-awaited second feature film was released, a revenge thriller titled Hwayi: A Monster Boy.

The year 2017, he directed political thriller film titled 1987: When the Day Comes. The film was a critical and commercial success, and won best director and best film in 9th KOFRA Film Awards and 39th Blue Dragon Film Awards for best film.

Personal life
Jang married actress Moon So-ri on December 24, 2006.

Filmography
1987: When the Day Comes (2017) - director
The Running Actress (2017) - actor 
Hwayi: A Monster Boy (화이, 2013) - director
Waiting for Jang Joon-hwan (장준환을 기다리며, short film, 2012) - cameo
Love for Sale (segment from omnibus Camellia 카멜리아, 2010) - director
Two or Three Things I Know about Kim Ki-young  (감독들, 김기영을 말하다, documentary, 2006) - cast
Hair (털, short film, 2004) - director, screenplay
Save the Green Planet! (지구를 지켜라!, 2003) - director, screenplay
Phantom: the Submarine (유령, 1999) - screenplay
Motel Cactus (모텔 선인장, 1997) - assistant director
Boong-boong (short film, 1996) - cinematography
Transmutated Head (변질헤드, short film, 1996) - cinematography
The Love of a Grape Seed (포도 씨앗의 사랑, short film, 1994) - cinematography
Sounds from Heaven and Earth (하늘소리 땅소리, short film, 1994) - cinematography
2001 Imagine (2001 이매진, short film, 1994) - director, screenplay, cast
Incoherence (지리멸렬, short film, 1994) - lighting
The Age of Success (short film, 1994)  - lighting

Awards
2018 55th Grand Bell Awards for Best Director
2018 18th Director's Cut Awards for Best Director

See also
List of Korean film directors
Cinema of Korea

References

External links

South Korean film directors
1970 births
Living people